The 2000 Kazakhstan Top Division was the ninth season of the Top Division, now called the Kazakhstan Premier League, the highest football league competition in Kazakhstan.

Teams
Following the conclusion of the previous season, no teams were relegated or promoted. Prior to the start of the season, Sintez became Tomiris, Access-Esil became Access-Golden Grain whilst Akmola moved back to Kokshetau.

During the middle of the season, Batyr withdrew due to financial problems, and Tomiris and Zhiger merged to form Dostyk. Dostyk were awarded the points that Tomiris had accumulated, whilst Zhiger were treated as having technical losses (0:3) in all remaining games.

Team overview

League table

Golden match

Results

Statistics

Top scorers

See also
Kazakhstan national football team 2000

References

Kazakhstan Premier League seasons
1
Kazakh
Kazakh